Somlek Sakdikul (born, 10 November 1953) is a Thai film actor and musician. He is sometimes credited as Somchai Sakdikul. He portrayed "Suwat" or "Daddy", the lecherous music producer in Pen-Ek Ratanaruang's 2001 comedy, Monrak Transistor. A prolific actor, he appears in several Thai films each year.

He also works as a tennis commentator for United Broadcasting Corporation, a cable television in Thailand.

Partial filmography
Monrak Transistor (2001)
Mekhong Full Moon Party (2002)
Buppah Rahtree (2003)
Hom rong (The Overture) (2004)
Sai Lor Fah (Pattaya Maniac) (2004)
SARS Wars (2004)
Jaew (M.A.I.D.) (2004)
Pad Thai Bride (2004)
Buppah Rahtree 2: Rahtree Returns (2005)Promise Me Not (2005)Rohng Tiam (Happy Inn) (2005)Luang Phii Theng (The Holy Man) (2005)In the Name of the Tiger (Seua phuu khaao) (2005)Ghost Variety (Variety phii chalui) (2005)Nam Prig Lhong Rua (Navy Boys) (2006)Thai Thief'' (2006)

External links
 

Living people
Somlek Sakdikul
Somlek Sakdikul
1953 births